Wil Boessen (born 3 May 1964) is a Dutch football manager and a former player. He is an assistant coach with Eerste Divisie side Jong PSV.

Club career
Born in Sittard, Boessen played a large part of his career for local side Fortuna Sittard. He also had spells at FC Dordrecht,  De Graafschap and Helmond Sport.

Managerial career
After retiring as a player, Boessen became assistant at VVV-Venlo and took temporarily charge twice during 10 seasons at the club just to be appointed by Fortuna in 2012. He moved to FC Oss in 2014.

He was manager of Lampang in the Thai Division 1 League and became manager of FC Den Bosch in summer 2017.

On 4 June 2019, he was appointed manager of Helmond Sport. Boessen was dismissed by Helmond Sport on 14 February 2022.

Before the 2022–23 season, Boessen was hired by Jong PSV as an assistant coach to Adil Ramzi.

References

External links
 Playing career stats

1964 births
Living people
People from Sittard
Association football fullbacks
Dutch footballers
Fortuna Sittard players
FC Dordrecht players
De Graafschap players
Helmond Sport players
Eredivisie players
Eerste Divisie players
Dutch football managers
VVV-Venlo managers
Fortuna Sittard managers
TOP Oss managers
Wil Boessen
FC Den Bosch managers
Helmond Sport managers
PSV Eindhoven non-playing staff
Eerste Divisie managers
Dutch expatriate football managers
Dutch expatriate sportspeople in Thailand
Expatriate football managers in Thailand
Footballers from Limburg (Netherlands)